Tom Phillips is an American businessman most closely associated with publishing ventures. He was the founding publisher of Spy Magazine, and a founding member of the original management team at Starwave. After the acquisition of Starwave by Disney, Phillips served simultaneously as the president of ABC News Internet Ventures and ESPN Internet Ventures, joint endeavors between Disney and Starwave. In 1998, Phillips was hired as the CEO of Deja.com, and sold the company's core assets to Google and eBay. In 2006, he took a position with Google, as director of print advertising, running advertisements for Google clients in newspapers and other print publications. He was subsequently put in charge of the acquisition process in Google's purchase of DoubleClick and then served as Director of Search and Analytics at Google. He left in 2009 to become CEO of Dstillery.

Phillips received his bachelor's degree from Harvard University in 1977 and his MBA from Stanford University in 1981.

References

Year of birth missing (living people)
Living people
American entertainment industry businesspeople
Place of birth missing (living people)
Harvard University alumni
Stanford Graduate School of Business alumni